Helen Moody defeated Helen Jacobs in the final, 6–4, 6–0 to win the ladies' singles tennis title at the 1938 Wimbledon Championships. This was Moody's 19th and last grand slam title, which would remain an all-time record until Margaret Court won her 20th major at the 1970 US Open. Dorothy Round was the defending champion, but did not compete.

Seeds

  Helen Moody (champion)
  Alice Marble (semifinals)
  Jadwiga Jędrzejowska (quarterfinals)
  Hilde Sperling (semifinals)
  Simonne Mathieu (quarterfinals)
  Kay Stammers (quarterfinals)
  Sarah Fabyan (quarterfinals)
  Peggy Scriven (fourth round)

Draw

Finals

Top half

Section 1

Section 2

Section 3

Section 4

Bottom half

Section 5

Section 6

Section 7

Section 8

References

External links

Women's Singles
Wimbledon Championship by year – Women's singles
Wimbledon Championships - singles
Wimbledon Championships - singles